Lozotaenia hesperia is a species of moth of the family Tortricidae first described by Powell in 1962. It is found in North America, where it has been recorded from Alaska, Yukon, Alberta, Saskatchewan and Quebec.

The wingspan is about 24 mm. The forewings are grey with fine dark grey lines throughout. The hindwings are light grey, but slightly darker grey towards the apex. Adults have been recorded on wing from late June to July.

References

	

Moths described in 1962
Archipini